Brian Anthony Wilson (born February 22, 1960) is an American film and television actor. He first appeared in the 1997 film The Postman as Woody. Wilson was born in Philadelphia, Pennsylvania. He has been married to Greer M. Richardson since 2005.

Filmography

Film

Television 
AMC’s Anne Rice’s Interview With the Vampire 
|Episode: 4 “The Ruthless Pursuit of Blood With All a Child’s Demanding”

References

External links

1960 births
Living people
Male actors from Philadelphia
American male film actors
American male television actors
21st-century American male actors